Paraibano is a town in Maranhão, Brazil.

Paraibano may also refer to:
 Demonym of Paraíba state, Brazil
 Campeonato Paraibano, a Brazilian football (soccer) competition
 Centro Sportivo Paraibano, a Brazilian football (soccer) player